Nkurunziza is a Bantu surname which means "good news". It may refer to:

Ananie Nkurunziza (1950s), Rwandan radio presenter and animateur
Denise Bucumi-Nkurunziza (born 1969), Burundian ordained minister; wife of Pierre Nkurunziza
Emmanuel Nkurunziza (born ?), Rwandan cyclist
Pierre Nkurunziza (1964–2020), Burundian president; husband of Denise Bucumi-Nkurunziza

Bantu-language surnames